Jeff Zenisek is an American football coach. He is the head football coach at Ellensburg High School in Ellensburg, Washington, a position he has held since 2019. Zenisek served as the head football coach at the Central Washington University from 1992 to 1996 and Western State College of Colorado—now known as Western Colorado University—from 2001 to 2005, compiling a career college football coaching record of 56–51–1 He led the 1995 Central Washington Wildcats football team to a share of the NAIA Division II Football National Championship.

Head coaching record

College

References

Year of birth missing (living people)
Living people
Central Washington Wildcats football coaches
Central Washington Wildcats football players
Northern Iowa Panthers football coaches
Western Colorado Mountaineers football coaches
High school football coaches in Washington (state)